is a Japanese professional shogi player ranked 4-dan.

Early life
Tokuda was born in Shūnan, Yamaguchi Prefecture on December 9, 1997.

Shogi professional

Apprentice professional
Tokuda was accepted into the Japan Shogi Association's (JSA) apprentice school at the rank of 6-kyū as a student of shogi professional Kenji Kobayashi in September 2010. He was promoted to the rank of apprentice professional 3-dan in 2018, and obtained full professional status and the corresponding rank of 4-dan in April 2022 after tying for first with Reo Okabe in the 70th 3-dan League (October 2021March 2022) with a record of 15 wins and 3 losses.

Titles and other championships
Tokuda has yet to appear in a major title match, but he has won one non-title tournament. He won the 12th  in October 2022 by defeating Yūya Saitō 2 games to 0 in the best-of-three championship match.

Promotion history
The promotion history for Tokuda is as follows.

6-kyū: September 2010
3-dan: April 2018
4-dan: April 1, 2022

References

External links
 ShogiHub: Professional Player Info · Kenshi Tokuda

Living people
1997 births
Japanese shogi players
Professional shogi players
Professional shogi players from Yamaguchi Prefecture
Kakogawa Seiryū